René Henri Theophile Lunden, Baron de Lunden (2 June 1902 – 3 April 1942) was a Belgian bobsledder who competed in the late 1930s. He won a gold medal in the two-man event at the 1939 FIBT World Championships in St. Moritz.

Lunden also competed at the 1936 Winter Olympics in Garmisch-Partenkirchen, finishing eighth in both the two-man and four-man events.

Lunden joined the British RAF during World War II, was commissioned as a Pilot Officer, and was killed in an air crash while returning from a mission in April 1942 aged 39. His body was repatriated to Belgium after the war.

References

External links
 
 
 René Lunden's biography

1902 births
1942 deaths
Belgian male bobsledders
Olympic bobsledders of Belgium
Bobsledders at the 1936 Winter Olympics
Royal Air Force personnel killed in World War II
Belgian military personnel killed in World War II
Royal Air Force pilots of World War II
British World War II bomber pilots
Royal Air Force officers
Royal Air Force Volunteer Reserve personnel of World War II